Franklin Mountains may refer to:
Franklin Mountains (Northwest Territories), Canada
Franklin Mountains (New Zealand)
Franklin Mountains (Alaska), United States
Franklin Mountains (Texas), United States
Franklin Mountains State Park